Coda is a 2019 film starring Patrick Stewart, Katie Holmes, and Giancarlo Esposito about a concert pianist (Stewart) who suffers from performance anxiety late in his career. The film is written by Louis Godbout and directed by Claude Lalonde.

The film premiered at the 2019 International Film Festival of India.

Plot
Henry Cole is an acclaimed classical pianist at the twilight of his career. He returns to the stage after a long absence following the death of his wife only to discover that his performance is marred by stage fright and overall mental instability. He barely escapes catastrophe as he suffers an anxiety attack on stage, running outside after finishing a number and smoking a cigarette.

At a post-recital press conference, he meets Helen Morrison, a music critic for The New Yorker. She wants to write a story about him and unsuccessfully asks for an interview. They meet again a few days later at Steinway Hall, where Henry suffers another episode while attempting to perform. Helen rescues him in extremis and earns his trust. Henry finally agrees to the interview.

Meanwhile, despite his agent Paul’s best efforts, Henry’s mental condition declines steadily. His recitals become more and more perilous, thus jeopardizing his comeback tour and his much anticipated and publicized final concert in London.

Henry is urged by Helen to travel to Sils Maria in the Swiss Alps in order to hear another pianist she once knew, famous for the therapeutic effect of his interpretation of Beethoven’s late piano sonatas. Once there, Henry’s symptoms at first worsen, but he gradually finds solace through walks in nature, curious but empathetic encounters with strangers, spirited chess matches with Felix, a hotel porter, and the music of Beethoven.

Cast
Patrick Stewart as Sir Henry Cole, a talented pianist.
Katie Holmes as Helen Morrison, a reporter for The New Yorker.
Giancarlo Esposito as Paul, Henry's agent.
Christoph Gaugler as Felix, owner of the inn in Sils Maria.

Music
The musical numbers in the film are performed by Ukrainian-born pianist Serhiy Salov, who also makes a cameo appearance.

Reception
Richard Roeper gave the film 3 out of 4 stars, stating that Stewart is "perfectly cast and delivers strong, carved-from-Shakespeare work as Sir Henry Cole." Joe Leydon of Variety also gave a positive review, praising the acting and how Godbout's screenplay avoided the usual cliches even if the narrative was predictable. A less favorable review came from John DeFore of The Hollywood Reporter, who states that "no single event is fatally implausible, perhaps, but taken together it doesn't ring true.""

References

External links 
 
 https://primaticefilms.com/films/coda/

2019 films
2010s English-language films